V0 may refer to:
 The IATA airline designator for Conviasa
 V0-morph, an organism that changes in shape during growth such that its surface area is proportional to its volume to the power 0
 ATPase, H+ transporting, lysosomal V0 subunit a1, a human gene
 The highest standard quality setting for variable-bitrate (VBR) MP3 files
 A classification under the UL 94 plastics flammability standard
 Initial velocity